Dick Kooy (born 3 December 1987) is a Dutch professional volleyball player with Italian citizenship. He competed for Italy in the 2019 World Cup. At the professional club level, he plays for PGE Skra Bełchatów.

In the past, he used to compete for the Netherlands national team.

Honours

Clubs
 CEV Champions League
  2020/2021 – with Itas Trentino

 National championships
 2008/2009  Dutch SuperCup, with Ortec Nesselande
 2008/2009  Dutch Championship, with Ortec Nesselande
 2012/2013  Italian SuperCup, with Cucine Lube Banca Marche Macerata
 2012/2013  Italian Championship, with Cucine Lube Banca Marche Macerata
 2013/2014  Polish Cup, with ZAKSA Kędzierzyn-Koźle
 2015/2016  Turkish SuperCup, with Halkbank Ankara
 2015/2016  Turkish Championship, with Halkbank Ankara
 2016/2017  Turkish Championship, with Halkbank Ankara

Individual awards
 2014: Polish Cup – Best Server

References

External links

 
 Player profile at LegaVolley.it  
 Player profile at PlusLiga.pl  
 Player profile at Volleybox.net 

1987 births
Living people
People from Baarn
Sportspeople from Utrecht (province)
Naturalised citizens of Italy
Dutch men's volleyball players
Italian men's volleyball players
Italian expatriate sportspeople in Poland
Expatriate volleyball players in Italy
Dutch expatriate sportspeople in Poland
Expatriate volleyball players in Poland
Dutch expatriate sportspeople in Qatar
Expatriate volleyball players in Qatar
Dutch expatriate sportspeople in Turkey
Expatriate volleyball players in Turkey
Dutch expatriate sportspeople in Russia
Expatriate volleyball players in Russia
Modena Volley players
ZAKSA Kędzierzyn-Koźle players
Halkbank volleyball players
Trentino Volley players
Skra Bełchatów players
Outside hitters